William Henry Pickering (February 15, 1858 – January 16, 1938) was an American astronomer.  Pickering constructed and established several observatories or astronomical observation stations, notably including Percival Lowell's Flagstaff Observatory. He led solar eclipse expeditions and studied craters on the Moon, and hypothesized that changes in the appearance of the crater Eratosthenes were due to "lunar insects". He spent much of the later part of his life at his private observatory in Jamaica.

Biography
William Pickering was born on February 15, 1858, in Boston, Massachusetts. His older brother was Edward Charles Pickering, director of the Harvard College Observatory for three decades.

He graduated from the Massachusetts Institute of Technology in 1879 then became an instructor in physics from 1880 to 1887.

He was elected a Fellow of the American Academy of Arts and Sciences in 1883 at age 25.

He discovered Saturn's ninth moon Phoebe in 1899 from plates taken in 1898.  He produced a photographic atlas of the Moon: The Moon : A Summary of the Existing Knowledge of our Satellite in 1903.

He believed he discovered a tenth Saturnian moon in 1905 from plates taken in 1904, which he called "Themis".  For this discovery he was awarded the Lalande Prize of the French Academy of Sciences in 1905. "Themis" was later shown to not exist.

Following George Darwin, he speculated in 1907 that the Moon was once a part of the Earth and that it broke away where now the Pacific Ocean lies. He also proposed a version of continental drift before Alfred Wegener where America, Asia, Africa, and Europe once formed a single continent, which broke up because of the separation of the Moon.

In 1908 he made a statement regarding the possibility of airplanes that had not yet been invented, saying that "a popular fantasy is to suppose that flying machines could be used to drop dynamite on the enemy in time of war".

In 1919, he predicted the existence and position of a Planet X based on anomalies in the positions of Uranus and Neptune but a search of Mount Wilson Observatory photographs failed to find the predicted planet.  Pluto was later discovered at Flagstaff by Clyde Tombaugh in 1930, but in any case it is now known that Pluto's mass is far too small to have appreciable gravitational effects on Uranus or Neptune, and the anomalies are accounted for when today's much more accurate values of planetary masses are used in calculating orbits. When the planet was named, he interpreted its symbol as a monogram referring to himself and Lowell by the phrase "Pickering-Lowell".

He claimed to have found vegetation on the Moon in 1921.

In 1923 he retired from Harvard University. He died on January 16, 1938, in Mandeville, Jamaica.

Awards
He won the Prix Lalande in 1905 and the Prix Jules Janssen in 1909. The asteroid 784 Pickeringia, and the craters Pickering on the Moon and Pickering on Mars, are jointly named after him and his brother Edward Charles Pickering.

References

External links
William H. Pickering Papers, 1892–1893 from the Smithsonian Institution Archives

Obituaries
 JRASC 32 (1938) 157 (one paragraph)
 MNRAS 99 (1939) 328
 PASP 50 (1938) 122
 PA 46 (1938) 299

1858 births
1938 deaths
American astronomers
Discoverers of moons
Fellows of the American Academy of Arts and Sciences
Harvard University faculty
Massachusetts Institute of Technology alumni
Massachusetts Institute of Technology School of Science faculty
Recipients of the Lalande Prize
Scientists from Boston